Slade Alive, Vol. 2 is the second live album by the British rock band Slade. It was released on 27 October 1978 and did not enter the charts. Titled as the follow-up to the band's commercially and critically successful 1972 album Slade Alive!, the performances on Slade Alive, Vol. 2 were taken from the band's autumn 1976 tour of the United States and their spring 1977 UK tour. The album was produced by Chas Chandler.

Background
Returning from the US in late 1976, Slade found the UK music business much changed from when they had left in 1975 to try and crack the American market. Punk rock had exploded to become the dominant influence on youth culture and the music press. Despite Slade's reputation as one of the great high-energy bands of their day, in this environment they had become irrelevant. Regardless, they were determined that they were now a better live act than ever and refused to call it a day. Their 1977 album Whatever Happened to Slade was a commercial failure, and on their UK spring tour they found they could no longer fill large venues.

By 1978, the band continued to suffer from a lack of commercial success. Despite being successful at filling small venues for their live performances, their new records were barely selling. With their new output no longer being released on Polydor Records but instead on manager Chas Chandler's label Barn Records, singles such as "Burning in the Heat of Love", "Give Us a Goal", "Rock 'n' Roll Bolero" and "Ginny, Ginny" were all chart failures. In the hope their live reputation would translate to success when released on record, the band released Slade Alive, Vol. 2 in October 1978. However, it too was a commercial failure, and Slade would only regain popularity after performing at the Reading Festival in 1980.

Track listing
All songs written by Noddy Holder and Jim Lea except "My Baby Left Me" by Arthur Crudup.

Critical reception

Upon the album's release, Record Mirror described it as a "worthwhile, if not exactly essential purchase, and enough possibly, to get the group back on an even keel". They added: "Slade are essentially a live band, no matter how good their records are, they'll never match up. All they will ever be are plastic souvenirs of a great live show." Superpop felt the album captured "exactly what [was] actually going on" with the band at the time, adding that the album was a "neat little package".

AllMusic retrospectively said: "Slade Alive, Vol. 2, like all live Slade, is searing. The album is excellent, both in terms of performance and sound quality. They also did a great job of selecting material for this disc. A nice balance of classics and newer material that hadn't really been heard before. Slade has by this point developed into a full-fledged heavy metal band while retaining everything that made them great in the first place."

Personnel
Slade
Noddy Holder - lead vocals, rhythm guitar
Dave Hill - lead guitar, backing vocals
Jim Lea - bass, backing vocals
Don Powell - drums

Additional personnel
Chas Chandler - producer
Alwyn Clayden - design (cover)
Alex Agor - photography
Alan Goldberg - stage lighting

References

1978 live albums
Slade live albums
Albums produced by Chas Chandler